The United States House of Representatives elections in California, 2006 were elections for California's delegation to the United States House of Representatives, which occurred along with congressional elections nationwide and state elections on November 7, 2006. Only one district, the 11th, changed party control when Democrat Jerry McNerney defeated Republican Richard Pombo.

Overview

Results
The following are the final results from the Secretary of State of California.

District 1

District 2

District 3

District 4

District 5

District 6

District 7

District 8

District 9

District 10

District 11

District 12

District 13

District 14

District 15

District 16

District 17

District 18

District 19

District 20

District 21

District 22

District 23

District 24

District 25

District 26

District 27

District 28

District 29

District 30

District 31

District 32

District 33

District 34

District 35

District 36

District 37

District 38

District 39

District 40

District 41

District 42

District 43

District 44

District 45

District 46

District 47

District 48

District 49

District 50

District 51

District 52

District 53

See also
110th United States Congress
Political party strength in California
Political party strength in U.S. states
United States House of Representatives elections, 2006

References

External links
California Legislative District Maps (1911-Present)
RAND California Election Returns: District Definitions

California
United States House of Representatives
2006